Dutch Island is a census-designated place (CDP) in Chatham County, Georgia, United States. It is part of the Savannah Metropolitan Statistical Area, and at the 2020 census, its population was 1,238.

Geography
It corresponds to the physical Dutch Island, a body of land surrounded by tidal channels: the Herb River to the northwest, the Wilmington River to the northeast, the Skidaway River to the southeast, and Grimball Creek to the southwest. The Wilmington and Skidaway rivers form part of the Atlantic Intracoastal Waterway. Dutch Island is connected by road to Isle of Hope to the southwest.

Demographics

References

Census-designated places in Chatham County, Georgia
Census-designated places in Georgia (U.S. state)
Savannah metropolitan area
Populated coastal places in Georgia (U.S. state)